Gorgopis is a genus of moths of the family Hepialidae. There are 28 described species found in southern and eastern Africa.

Species
Gorgopis alticola - Tanzania
Gorgopis angustiptera
Gorgopis annulosa - South Africa
Gorgopis armillata - South Africa
Gorgopis auratilis - South Africa
Gorgopis aurifuscata
Gorgopis butlerii - South Africa
Gorgopis caffra - South Africa
Gorgopis centaurica - South Africa
Gorgopis cochlias - South Africa
Gorgopis crudeni - South Africa
Gorgopis furcata - South Africa
Gorgopis fuscalis - South Africa
Gorgopis grisescens - South Africa
Gorgopis hunti - South Africa
Gorgopis inornata - South Africa
Gorgopis intervallata - South Africa
Gorgopis leucopetala - South Africa
Gorgopis libania - South Africa/Angola
Larva feeds on grasses
Gorgopis limbopunctata
Gorgopis lobata - South Africa
Gorgopis olivaceonotata - South Africa
Gorgopis pallidiflava - South Africa
Gorgopis pholidota - South Africa
Gorgopis ptiloscelis - South Africa
Gorgopis salti - Tanzania
Gorgopis serangota - South Africa
Gorgopis subrimosa - South Africa
Gorgopis tanganyikaensis - Tanzania
Gorgopis zellerii - South Africa

External links
Hepialidae genera

Hepialidae
Exoporia genera
Taxa named by Jacob Hübner